Presidential elections were due to be held in Cyprus on 18 February 1973. However, as incumbent President Makarios III was the only candidate, the elections were not held and Makarios III was automatically declared the winner.

A separate election for Vice President of Cyprus took place. Rauf Denktaş stood unopposed and was elected.

Electoral system
The elections were held using a two-round system; if no candidate received over 50% of the vote in the first round, a second round was to be held between the top two candidates. The constitution required the President of Cyprus to be a Greek Cypriot and the Vice-President to be a Turkish Cypriot. Greek Cypriots elected the President and Turkish Cypriots elected the Vice-President.

References

1973 in Cyprus
Cyprus
Presidential elections in Cyprus
Single-candidate elections
Uncontested elections
February 1973 events in Europe